Ctenanthe amabilis, called the beautiful ctenanthe, is a species of flowering plant in the genus Ctenanthe, likely native to Brazil, and introduced into Costa Rica. It has gained the Royal Horticultural Society's Award of Garden Merit as a subtropical hothouse ornamental.

References

Marantaceae
Plants described in 1987